Gateway Sixth Form College is a sixth form college in Hamilton, Leicester, England.

The college used to be housed in the city centre of Leicester, adjacent to the main campus of De Montfort University and located by other buildings of academic interests such as the Daneil Lambert Museum, Newarke House, Leicester Castle and Castle Gardens. The bridge from where the deceased body of Richard III was said to have been thrown from (prior to being found elsewhere) is also a short walk from the original site. It has since moved to a new, £33 million campus built in the Hamilton suburb of the city.

History
The school began as Gateway Grammar School for boys. It was founded in 1928 and located in Skeffington House which is now the home of the Newarke Houses Museum. The school was established primarily to feed the Colleges of Art and Technology (later Leicester Polytechnic and now De Montfort University) and the curriculum showed a significant bias towards Craft and other practical subjects.

In 1933 it moved across the road to the site it occupied until 2009, which comprised a three-storey house dating from 1772 with a purpose-built extension and additional buildings for science, and art and design.

Its first head master (1928–31) was Harold Dent who went on to become editor of The Times Educational Supplement and professor of education at the University of Sheffield. Dent was succeeded by E C White (1931-1952) and then Hyman Frazer (1952–71), whose granddaughter Lucy Frazer became a UK Cabinet minister in 2023. In Frazer's time the Gateway (as it was known by locals) became more like a conventional grammar school but retained its commitment to teaching crafts. It was also progressive in its acceptance of 11+ exam "failures" at 13+ and 15+, some of whom achieved distinction and are among those listed in alumni below. M H Bailey (1971-1990) saw the school through its transformation into a mixed sixth form college in 1976. After Bailey's retirement the college principals were A Sortwell (1990–97), N A Goffin (1997-2009), S Overton-Edwards (2009-2016). The current principal is J Bagley.

Gateway joined Better Futures Multi Academy Trust in April 2019.

Courses
The student body consists of approximately 1,200 students aged 16–18 and 400 adult students. The college is highly diverse with 75% of all learners from minority ethnic backgrounds. This is representative of the diversity in Leicester.

Alumni
 Matt Lloyd, ice sledge hockey Paralympian, who has been honoured by the college who have named an annual community sports award after him.  
 Claudia Webbe, Independent MP

Gateway Technical Grammar School
 Sir Damon Buffini, head of private equity firm Permira
 Greg Clarke, chairman of the FA from 2016 to 2020 and Chairman of the Football League, 2010-2016; CEO of the Lend Lease Corporation, 2002-2009; CEO of Cable & Wireless, 1999-2000
 Malcolm Clarke (composer), of the BBC Radiophonic Workshop, who composed music for Doctor Who in the early 1980s
 Harold Hopkins, physicist; developed the zoom lens; did significant work on fibre-optics
 Henry Lowther, jazz and classical trumpet player
 Tony Selvidge, original keyboard play of prog rock band Yes (as Tony Kaye)
 Tom Rand, Oscar-nominated costume designer, The French Lieutenant's Woman
 Colin Wilson, writer

See also
 Regent College, Leicester
 Wyggeston and Queen Elizabeth I College

References

External links
 
 Ofsted Report for Gateway Sixth Form College
 EduBase

Education in Leicester
Sixth form colleges in Leicestershire